The High Steel Bridge is a truss arch bridge that spans the south fork of the Skokomish River, on National Forest Service road #2340 in Mason County, Washington, near the city of Shelton.

History
Built in 1929, the bridge originally carried a rail line whose construction made logging operations possible in new areas of the Olympic Peninsula. 

Along with the Vance Creek Bridge, it was one of two similar bridges built for the rail line by the Simpson Logging Company, which contracted its construction to the American Bridge Company. 

At the time of the bridges' construction, new rail lines for logging were becoming increasingly cost-prohibitive, and most companies began using trucks in their place. 

The expense of rail led to the bridges' unusual steel construction; while most logging bridges were temporary wooden structions, the Simpson Logging Company felt that only a permanent bridge would justify their investment. 

The bridge was converted to a roadway in 1964, though it continues to be used for logging. On July 16, 1982, the bridge was added to the National Register of Historic Places.

See also
List of bridges in the United States by height

Notes

Bridges completed in 1929
Road bridges on the National Register of Historic Places in Washington (state)
Transportation buildings and structures in Mason County, Washington
Railroad bridges in Washington (state)
National Register of Historic Places in Mason County, Washington
Railroad bridges on the National Register of Historic Places in Washington (state)
Steel bridges in the United States
Truss arch bridges in the United States